4,4’-Difluorobenzophenone is an organic compound with the formula of (FC6H4)2CO.  This colorless solid is commonly used as a precursor to PEEK, or polyetherether ketone, a so-called high performance polymer.  Because PEEK is resistant to attack, it is commonly used in carbon fiber coatings and cable insulation.

Synthesis
4,4’-Difluorobenzophenone is prepared by the acylation of fluorobenzene with p-fluorobenzoyl chloride. The conversion is typically conducted in the presence of an aluminium chloride catalyst in a petroleum ether solvent.
FC6H4C(O)Cl + C6H5F → (FC6H4)2CO + HCl

Uses
The polymer PEEK is generated from the reaction of 4,4'-difluorobenzophenone with the salts of 1,4-benzenediol.
C6H4(ONa)2  +  (FC6H4)2CO   →  1/n[(C6H4O2)(C13H8O)]n  +  2 NaF

References

Fluoroarenes
Benzophenones